The Association of Employment and Learning Providers (AELP) is the leading trade association for vocational learning and employment providers in Britain. The majority of its 700 members are independent private, not-for-profit and voluntary sector training and employment services organisations, universities and colleges and end-point assessment organisations working in the apprenticeship field.

Membership is open to any provider committed to quality provision and it includes 38 FE colleges involved in work based learning. AELP members train 75% of England's 850,000 apprentices currently on programme. Over 70% of the Work Programme prime contractors are AELP members with many other members delivering the programme as sub-contractors. AELP providers currently engage with almost 300,000 employers across the country and in 2014 they helped 117,240 learners complete an apprenticeship.

References

Educational organisations based in the United Kingdom
Trade associations based in the United Kingdom